Lieutenant General Thomas William Corbett,  (2 June 1888 – 30 December 1981) was a British Indian Army officer who commanded the IV Corps during the Second World War.

Early life and military career
Corbett attended the Royal Military College, Sandhurst and was commissioned onto the Unattached List for the British Indian Army on 19 January 1907. Posted to India, he was attached to the 1st Battalion The Queens Regiment on 15 March 1907 for a year. He was admitted to Indian Army 15 March 1908 and joined 9th Hodson's Horse.

Following the outbreak of World War I, Corbett landed in France on 7 November 1914 and was wounded on 21 December. He became staff captain of the 3rd (Ambala) Cavalry Brigade on 4 April 1916, brigade major for the 1st Cavalry Brigade on 8 June 1917, and brigade major for the Ambala Brigade on 23 February 1918. He served in France until 31 March 1918, when he transferred to serve in Palestine. He was awarded the Military Cross in the London Gazette of 3 June 1918. He was wounded on 23 May while leading a trench raid, for which he was later awarded a Bar to his Military Cross. Corbett was also mentioned in dispatches twice. He went on to be brigade major for the 160th Brigade, Egyptian Expeditionary Force on 2 August 1918.

Between the wars
After the war Corbett became Deputy Adjutant and Quartermaster General for 4th Cavalry Division of the Egyptian Expeditionary Force from 7 August 1919 to 31 August 1920.

Corbett attended Staff College, Quetta in 1921–22 and was appointed a general staff officer grade 2 on the General Staff, Southern Command, India from 15 February 1922 until 28 August 1925. He was again appointed a general staff officer grade 2 as staff officer to Major-General Cavalry from 26 September 1925 to 4 December 1926.

Corbett was appointed a general staff officer grade 2 and instructor at the Staff College, Quetta from 14 January 1930 to 31 August 1932, and transferred to 2nd Lancers on 12 May 1930. He served as commanding officer of 2nd Lancers from 31 October 1933 to 7 April 1935. He was subsequently appointed to the post of assistant adjutant and quartermaster general from 8 April 1935 to 5 September 1935. He served as a general staff officer grade 1 and instructor at the Staff College, Quetta from 6 September 1935 to 27 June 1938 and as commander of the Sialkot Brigade from 2 August 1938 to 28 January 1940.

Second World War
Corbett served in the Second World War as a brigadier responsible for the cavalry at Army Headquarters India and then as Inspector of Cavalry Army Headquarters India from 29 January 1940 to 31 August 1940, before becoming General Officer Commanding (GOC) of the 1st Indian Armoured Division on 1 September (later known as 31st Indian Armoured Division). He was appointed a Companion of the Order of the Bath in January 1941. He went on to be commander of IV Corps from January to March 1942 in Iraq, before being appointed chief of staff in the Middle East later that year. Corbett was dismissed in the 'Cairo purge' in August 1942. He was then GOC 7th Indian Infantry Division in India from 23 October 1942 until July 1943, when he handed command over to Frank Messervy before retiring as a major general 23 October 1943.

By October 1945 Corbett had been re-employed as head of the Combined Inter Services Historical Section (India) while on the Indian Regular Reserve of Officers.

References

Bibliography

External links 
 The Papers of Lieutenant-General Thomas Corbett held at Churchill Archives Centre, Cambridge
Generals of World War II

|-

|-

|-

1888 births
1980 deaths
Academics of the Staff College, Quetta
Indian Army generals of World War II
Recipients of the Military Cross
Companions of the Order of the Bath
Graduates of the Royal Military College, Sandhurst
Indian Army personnel of World War I
Graduates of the Staff College, Quetta
British Indian Army generals